Timezrit may refer to:

 Timezrit, Béjaïa - a commune or municipality of Béjaïa province, Algeria
 Timezrit, Boumerdès - a commune or municipality of Boumerdès province, Algeria